Čepřovice is a municipality and village in Strakonice District in the South Bohemian Region of the Czech Republic. It has about 200 inhabitants.

Administrative parts
Villages of Jiřetice and Koječín are administrative parts of Čepřovice.

References

Villages in Strakonice District